Graphis plumierae is a species of script lichen in the family Graphidaceae. It was described as new to science in 1915 by Finnish mycologist Edvard Vainio. The type was collected in Gourbeyre, Guadeloupe. In 2016, G. plumierae was reported from Portugal, which was also a new occurrence for Europe.

Graphis plumierae has labia that are white-pruinose. The lirellae (these are ascomata with a long, narrow disc resembling dark squiggly lines), which are immersed in the substrate, have a lateral thalline margin. The lichen contains the secondary compounds norstictic acid, stictic, and salazinic acid. It grows on bark.

References

Lichens described in 1915
Lichen species
Lichens of Asia
Lichens of Southwestern Europe
Lichens of the Caribbean
Taxa named by Edvard August Vainio
plumierae